Benjamin Conz (born September 13, 1991) is a Swiss professional ice hockey goaltender who currently plays for HC Ambrì-Piotta of the National League (NL). He was eligible for the 2009 NHL Entry Draft and 2010 NHL Entry Draft, but went undrafted, being drafted 185th overall in the 2010 KHL Junior Draft by SKA St. Petersburg instead.

Playing career
Benjamin started his career in the 2007–08 with the Swiss U20 team, which competed in the Swiss League (SL).  After moderate showing in the SL, he signed his first professional contract with Genève-Servette HC of the National League (NL).  He posted a 2.50 GAA in 21 games played with Servette.  For the 2009–2010 season, he was on loan to the SCL Tigers, also in the NL, located in Langnau im Emmental. He was ranked as the fourth best international goaltender by the NHL Central Scouting Bureau in 2010, and entered into the 2010 NHL Entry Draft but he still went undrafted. TSN's hockey analysts Pierre McGuire and Gord Miller both compared Conz favourably to Conn Smythe winner and Stanley Cup champion Jean-Sébastien Giguère.

On June 21, 2017, Conz was shipped to HC Ambrì-Piotta despite one year remaining on his contract with Fribourg. He was signed to a one-year contract by Ambri with an option for a second year. Ambri-Piotta exercised his option on February 1, 2018.

On November 11, 2018, Conz was signed to an early two-year contract extension by Ambri-Piotta through the 2020/21 season. With a nagging hip injury following the 2018-19 season, Conz had to undergo surgery on May 20, 2019. He was sidelined for 5 months and returned to game action on October 27, 2019 on a rehab assignment with the HCB Ticino Rockets of the Swiss League. He eventually returned to play with Ambri-Piotta but sustained an adductor injury on December 8, 2019, forcing him to sit out a month of competition, including the 2019 Spengler Cup in which Ambri-Piotta was invited.

International play
At the 2010 IIHF World U20 Championships, Conz led the Swiss team to impressive fourth place finish.  He managed an upset of the Slovaks by stopping 39 shots in a 4–1 victory.  This victory advanced Switzerland to the knockout round to face the highly favoured Russian squad.  Against the Russian, Conz had another impressive match where he made 50 saves on 52 shots, as the Swiss advanced 3–2.  After losing to the Canadians 6–1 and Swedes 11–4 and out of the medals, Conz finished the tournament with a 4.76 GAA and an 89.31% save percentage, an impressive feat due to the workload the over-matched Swiss defence allowed on Conz. He faced more than 300 shots on goal, making him the tournament's busiest goalie, and his 284 saves in seven games were tournament best. Despite allowing the second most goals in the tournament at 34, he was selected to the tournament all-star team and named the best goaltender.

Awards
2010 IIHF World Juniors all-star team.
IIHF Best goaltender Award - 2010 World Juniors.
Spengler Cup Champion - 2022 (HC Ambrì-Piotta)

Career statistics
As of the end of the 2008–09 season.

International
As of the end of the 2009–10 season.

References

External links
 
 
 

1991 births
Living people
HC Ambrì-Piotta players
HC Lugano players
People from Porrentruy
HC Fribourg-Gottéron players
Genève-Servette HC players
SCL Tigers players
Swiss ice hockey goaltenders
Sportspeople from the canton of Jura